The Chiahui Power Plant is a gas-fired power plant in Songshan Village, Minxiong Township, Chiayi County, Taiwan.

History
The construction of the power plant began in January 2002 and the commissioning of unit 1 of the plant was done in December 2003. The project is the first independent power producer project in Taiwan. In July 2020, the power plant was awarded Occupational Safety and Health Administration Agency's Model Site Award. A second unit was added to the plant beginning in December 2018; it was commissioned in August 2021.

Ownership
Asia Cement Corporation (ACC) and its affiliates owns 59% of equity share, while J-Power owns 40%. The remaining 1% share is owned by other private shareholders. In September 2020 J-Power sold all its shares to ACC.

Generation units
The power plant has a total installed generation capacity of 1210 MW, consisting of two generation units.

Unit 1 has an installed capacity of 670 (or 700) MW. It consists of multiple-shaft combined cycle unit with one steam turbine-generator, three gas turbine generators and three heat recovery steam generators, designed for natural gas firing. The gas turbine generators came from General Electric with F-class technology and was shipped in 2002. Each has 18-stage axial compressor and 3-stage turbine. It also features a cold-end drive and axial exhaust.

Unit 2 has an installed capacity of 510 (or 535) MW.

Function
The power plant is designed for intermediate load operation with daily startup and shutdown to sell power to match the power dispatch schedule of Taipower. The whole generated electricity is sold to Taipower.

Transportation
Chiahui Power Plant is accessible west from Minxiong Station of Taiwan Railways.

See also

 List of power stations in Taiwan
 Electricity sector in Taiwan

References

2003 establishments in Taiwan
Buildings and structures in Chiayi County
Energy infrastructure completed in 2003
Natural gas-fired power stations in Taiwan